The United States Department of Defense has estimated that approximately 61,000 Puerto Ricans served in the military during the Korean War, most of them volunteers. A total of 122 Puerto Rican soldiers were among the 8,200 people listed as missing in action (MIA). According to the Defense POW/MIA Accounting Agency, there are 167 who are unaccounted for. This list does not include non-Puerto Ricans who served in the 65th Infantry, nor those who were "POW" (Prisoners of War) or "KIA" (Killed in Action). Nor does the total of this list include people of Puerto Rican descent who were born in the mainland of the United States.

Spain officially ceded Puerto Rico to the United States under the terms of the 1898 Treaty of Paris which concluded the Spanish–American War.  It is a United States territory and upon the outbreak of World War I, the Congress enacted the Jones–Shafroth Act, which gave Puerto Ricans American citizenship with certain limitations (for example, Puerto Ricans are not allowed to vote in presidential elections).

Thousands of Puerto Ricans participated in these conflicts. Many lived and returned to their homeland, others either died or have been listed as missing in action. The term "MIA" dates from 1946 and refers to a member of the armed services who is reported missing following a combat mission and whose status as to injury, capture, or death is unknown. The missing combatant must not have been otherwise accounted for as either killed in action or a prisoner of war. The Korean War was one of two major conflicts which accounted for the most Puerto Ricans missing in action, the other being the Vietnam War.

Korean War
 
According to the online archive "All POW-MIA Korean War Casualties," the total number of Puerto Rican casualties in the Korean War was 732. Out of the more than 700 casualties suffered in the war, a total of 122 Puerto Rican men were listed as Missing in Action.

It was during the Korean War that Puerto Ricans suffered the most casualties as members of an all-Hispanic volunteer unit: the 65th Infantry Regiment. One of the problems the unit faced was the language difference; the common foot soldier spoke only Spanish, while the commanding officers were mostly English-speaking.  In September 1952, the 65th Infantry was holding onto a hill known as "Outpost Kelly"  until the People's Volunteer Army which had joined the North Koreans, overran the position. This became known as the Battle for Outpost Kelly. Twice, the 65th Regiment was overwhelmed by Chinese artillery and driven off. The Battle of Outpost Kelly accounted for 73 of the men missing in action from the total of 122. Out of the 73 MIAs suffered by the regiment in the month of September, 50 of them occurred on the same day: September 18.

According to the Defense POW/MIA Accounting Agency seven Puerto Ricans who were members of the United States Marine Corps, with the exception of PFC Ramón Núñez-Juárez and PFC Manuel Perez-Pizarro who were Killed In Action. PFC Enrique Romero-Nieves and PFC Ramón Núñez-Juárez were awarded the Navy Cross, the second highest medal after the Medal of Honor that can be awarded by the Department of the Navy. Ramón Núñez-Juárez, who was listed as MIA, was posthumously awarded the medal. Núñez-Juárez's remains have never been recovered and a symbolic burial with full military honors was held on October 25, 1970. There is a headstone with his name inscribed above an empty grave in the Puerto Rico National Cemetery, located in Bayamon, Puerto Rico. His name and that of the others are inscribed in El Monumento de la Recordación, a monument dedicated to the Puerto Ricans who have fallen in combat, located in San Juan, Puerto Rico.

Puerto Ricans missing in action
The following is a list with the names, ranks and the date in which 122 Puerto Ricans were listed as missing in action in the Korean War.

All of these men served within the ranks of the United States Army with the exception of Ramón Núñez-Juárez and Francisco González Matías, who served in the United States Marine Corps.

Their names are inscribed in El Monumento de la Recordación (The Wall of Remembrance) located in San Juan, Puerto Rico.

See also

 Military history of Puerto Rico
 65th Infantry Regiment
 Henry Barracks, Puerto Rico
 Camp Las Casas
 List of Puerto Ricans missing in action in the Vietnam War
 List of Puerto Rican military personnel
 Borinqueneers Congressional Gold Medal

References

Further reading
 Puertorriquenos Who Served With Guts, Glory, and Honor. Fighting to Defend a Nation Not Completely Their Own; by  Greg Boudonck; 
 Historia militar de Puerto Rico; by Hector Andres Negroni; Sociedad Estatal Quinto Centenario (1992); 

Korean War
Korean War
Puerto Rica